New Broadcasting House may refer to these BBC buildings in England:

Broadcasting House in London
New Broadcasting House, Manchester